Alga (Alğa) is a rural locality (a village) in Chuyunchinsky Selsoviet, Davlekanovsky District, Bashkortostan, Russia. The population was 88 as of 2010.

Geography 
It is located 33 km from Davlekanovo.

References 

Rural localities in Davlekanovsky District